The Colombian Open, or Abierto de Colombia, is a golf tournament on the Colombian Tour and PGA Tour Latinoamérica that was first played in 1945. It has also on occasion been an event on the Tour de las Americas.

In 2001, Camilo Villegas won a record fifth consecutive amateur prize, at the same time becoming only the second amateur to take the overall title.

Winners

Notes

References

External links
Federación Colombiana de Golf – official site
Coverage on the PGA Tour Latinoamérica site

Golf tournaments in Colombia
PGA Tour Latinoamérica events
Former Tour de las Américas events
Recurring sporting events established in 1945
1945 establishments in Colombia